Wesseling is an industrial German city on the Rhine bordering Cologne city on the south. With three chemical plants and a petroleum refinery within its city limits, it has an important place in the international petrochemical industry.

History and etymology
The find of Roman consecration altars, the excavation of a Roman country house and Franconian burial grounds are early evidence of the settlement of the place. Wesseling originates from the Latin "Wasliacum" which means "Village of Waslica". The story that Wesseling originates from "changing of the rope" from when Rhine boats were pulled by horses is something like an urban legend because the name Wesseling is centuries older than the horse-changing station, which was located in Wesseling in the 18th century.

Around 1700 there was a team changing point for towing boats in Wesseling. Until industrialization, the place between Cologne and Bonn remained rather insignificant. Only in 1793 did a tannery hint at the coming industrial age. In 1848 a democratic workers' association was founded in Wesseling. In this year, the uprising of the Treidler (Rheinhalfen) spread to the Wesselinger Treidelstation, who saw their trade endangered by the upcoming steamship. In 1880, Heinrich and Franz Zimmermann founded the 'Chemische Fabrik Wesseling' for the processing of gas cleaning mass as the origin of today's Evonik chemical works in the north of the city. In 1904 the construction of the Rheinuferbahn (Rhine bank railway) from Cologne via Wesseling to Bonn began. A transverse railway has connected Wesseling with Brühl since 1900. Today, this line is mostly used for freight traffic.

During the World War II from 1939 to 1945, around 10,000 foreign and forced laborers were employed in Wesseling's industry. For comparison, the city itself had only 7,500 inhabitants. The forced laborers, most of whom were employed in the UK and Deutsche Norton, were in wooden barrack camps accommodated. The so-called 'southern camp was located next to today's station in Wesseling-Süd. Another barracks camp was located directly on the Rhine, the so-called 'Rhine camp'. Wesseling was conquered and occupied -similar to Cologne- early March 1945 as part of Operation Lumberjack by the First United States Army.

Economy

In addition to 4 subdivisions, Wesseling has the industrial areas "Rheinbogen" and "Eichholz". Home to several chemical companies including Evonik, and Basell, and a Royal Dutch Shell oil refinery; the city was a bombing target of the Oil Campaign of World War II.

Subdivisions

Twin towns – sister cities

Wesseling is twinned with:
 Leuna, Germany
 Pontivy, France
 Traunstein, Germany
 West Devon, England, United Kingdom

References
Content in this edit is translated from the existing German Wikipedia article at Wesseling; see its history for attribution.

Oil campaign of World War II
Towns in North Rhine-Westphalia
Rhein-Erft-Kreis